Xuchang (postal: Hsuchang) is a prefecture-level city in central Henan province in Central China. It borders the provincial capital of Zhengzhou to the northwest, Kaifeng to the northeast, Zhoukou to the east, Luohe to the southeast, and Pingdingshan to the southwest.

Its population was 4,307,488 inhabitants at the final 2010 census, of whom 1,952,666 lived in the built-up (or "metro") area made up of Weidu and Jian'an districts (named from Emperor Xian of Han’s era name) and Changge City largely being urbanized.  In 2007, the city was named as one of China's top ten livable cities by Chinese Cities Brand Value Report, which was released at 2007 Beijing Summit of China Cities Forum.

Administration
The prefecture-level city of Xuchang administers 2 district, 2 county-level cities and 2 counties.
Weidu District
Jian'an District
Yuzhou City
Changge City
Yanling County
Xiangcheng County

History
According to tradition, the city was named after Xu, an ancient state led by tribal leader Xuyou during the Spring and Autumn period of the Zhou Dynasty. In ancient times, the city occupied a strategic location in central China. It may have been the origin of the surname Xǔ (許/许).

Xuchang served as the warlord Cao Cao's de facto capital during the late Eastern Han Dynasty. After finding the old capital Luoyang ravaged by war, Cao moved the imperial court and Emperor Xian to what is now Xuchang in 196.

In 220, Cao Cao's son and successor Cao Pi officially declared the city as the capital of the newly established state of Cao Wei. The city was renamed "Xuchang" taken to mean "Xu Rising/". The Wei emperors held court at Xuchang until the capital was moved to Luoyang in the 220s.

Geography and climate
Xuchang ranges in latitude from 33° 16' to 34° 24' N and in longitude from 113° 03' to 114° 190' E.

Xuchang has a monsoon-influenced humid subtropical climate (Köppen Cwa), with four distinct seasons. Winters are cool and dry, summers hot and humid, spring begins early and is warm, and autumn is mild and provides a reasonable transition. Rain mainly falls from May to September, as more than 70% of the annual precipitation occurs then.

Economy
Xuchang is an important center of the Chinese tobacco industry.

The manufacturing industry the city is best known for is wigs and hair extensions with exports worth about $1 billion in 2016. The industry started around 1900 when German merchants purchased hair from the local area. It was revived in the 1980s and in 1990 a local entrepreneur Zheng Youquan merged a number of smaller hair manufacturing workshops into Rebecca Hair Products, a larger entity that quickly expanded to international markets and became the largest wig maker in the world.

Education
Xuchang University is in the city.

Tourism
Famous tourist attractions include Baling Bridge and Chunqiu Tower.

Sister city
On 18 December 2006, the Oromia Region government in Ethiopia signed an agreement with Henan Province to establish a sister city program with Ambo. Bolingbrook, Illinois is also a sister city of Xuchang.

Notes

External links

Government website of Xuchang (in Simplified Chinese)

 
Cities in Henan
Ancient Chinese capitals
Prefecture-level divisions of Henan
National Forest Cities in China